The 1996 Speedway Grand Prix of Denmark was the sixth and last race of the 1996 Speedway Grand Prix season. It took place on 21 September in the Speedway Center in Vojens, Denmark It was second Danish SGP and was won by American rider Billy Hamill. It was third win of his career.

Starting positions draw 

The Speedway Grand Prix Commission nominated Piotr Protasiewicz from Poland as Wild Card.
 Draw 18.  (14) Gary Havelock →  (19) Tomasz Gollob

Heat details

The final classification

See also 
 Speedway Grand Prix
 List of Speedway Grand Prix riders

References

External links 
 FIM-live.com
 SpeedwayWorld.tv

Speedway Grand Prix of Denmark
D
1996